Šrobárová is a village and municipality in the Komárno District in the Nitra Region of south-west Slovakia.

Geography
The village lies at an altitude of 122 metres and covers an area of 8.388 km².
It has a population of about 485 people.

History
In the 9th century, the territory of Šrobárová became part of the Kingdom of Hungary. After the Austro-Hungarian army disintegrated in November 1918, Czechoslovak troops occupied the area, later acknowledged internationally by the Treaty of Trianon. The village was established in 1926.
Between 1938 and 1945 Šrobárová once more  became part of Miklós Horthy's Hungary through the First Vienna Award. From 1945 until the Velvet Divorce, it was part of Czechoslovakia. Since then it has been part of Slovakia.

Demographics
The village is around 96% Slovak and 4% Magyar.

Facilities
The village has a public library and a football pitch.

Villages and municipalities in the Komárno District